Pacific Ocean Blues is a 1977 song by Dennis Wilson.

Pacific Ocean Blues may also refer to:
 Pacific Ocean Blue, a 1977 album by Dennis Wilson
 Pacific Ocean Blues (album), a 2002 album by Gigolo Aunts